Perathiepin is a neuroleptic drug of the tricyclic family which was developed in the 1960s but was never marketed. In animal studies it was found to possess central depressant, antihistamine, antiserotonergic, and analgesic effects.

See also
 Clorotepine
 Metitepine

References

Antipsychotics
Dibenzothiepines
Diphenylethylpiperazines